The XLIX Grand Prix de France Henri Deglane 2023 (also known as Grand Prix of France 2023 and Henri Deglane Grand Prix 2023) was a wrestling event held in Nice, France. It was held in the memory of 1924 Olympic Gold medalist Henri Deglane.

Event videos
The event will air on the fflutte.sportall.tv channel.

Medal table

Team ranking

Medal overview

Men's freestyle

Men's Greco-Roman

Women's freestyle

References

External links 
 Database
 Results Book

2023 in sport wrestling
2023 in French sport
International wrestling competitions hosted by France
Sport in France
Sport in Nice
January 2023 sports events in France